The brown-capped rosy finch (Leucosticte australis) is a medium-sized finch endemic to North America.

Adults are brown on the head, back, and breast with pink on the belly, rump, and wings. The forehead is black. They have short black legs and a long forked tail.

Their breeding habitat is mountain peaks in the central Rocky Mountains of the United States. They build a cup nest in a cavity on a cliff, or re-use abandoned cliff swallow nests.

In winter, these birds migrate short distances to lower elevations.

These birds forage on the ground, but may fly to catch insects in flight. They mainly eat seeds from weeds and grasses and insects. They often feed in small flocks.

At one time, the three North American rosy finches were considered to be one species.

The population of this bird appears to be declining.

Gallery

References

External links
Photo

Further reading

Book

 Johnson, R. E., P. Hendricks, D. L. Pattie, and K. B. Hunter. 2000. Brown-capped Rosy-Finch (Leucosticte australis). In The Birds of North America, No. 536 (A. Poole and F. Gill, eds.). The Birds of North America, Inc., Philadelphia, PA.

Articles
 Banks RC & Browning MR. (1980). Correct Citations for Some North American Bird Taxa. Proceedings of the Biological Society of Washington. vol 92, no 1. pp. 195–203.
 Hendricks DP. (1977). Brown-Capped Rosy Finch Nesting in New-Mexico. Auk. vol 94, no 2. pp. 384–385.
 Hendricks P. (1978). Notes on the Courtship Behavior of Brown-Capped Rosy Finches. Wilson Bulletin. vol 90, no 2. pp. 285–287.
 Hendricks P. (1980). Reaction of Brown-Capped Rosy Finches Leucosticte-Australis to Banded Nestlings. Journal of Field Ornithology. vol 51, no 2.
 Johnson RE. (1965). Reproductive activities of rosy finches, with special reference to Montana. Auk vol 82 pp. 190–205.
 Johnson RE. (1977). Seasonal Variation in the Genus Leucosticte in North America. Condor. vol 79, no 1. pp. 76–86.
 Marti CD & Braun CE. (1975). Use of Tundra Habitats by Prairie Falcons in Colorado USA. Condor. vol 77 pp. 213–214.
 Shreeve D. F.  (1980). Behaviour of the Aleutian Grey-crowned and Brown-capped rosy finches Leucosticte tephrocotis. Ibis vol 122 pp. 145–165.

brown-capped rosy finch
Endemic birds of the Western United States
brown-capped rosy finch
Taxa named by Robert Ridgway